The Registrar, more specifically the Registrar of the Court of Final Appeal, is appointed by the Chief Executive of Hong Kong to assist in the work of the Court of Final Appeal. The Registrar may also be allowed to hold a concurrent judicial role, such as being a judge, in the lower courts.

Duties of the Registrar 
The Registrar will consider each leave application (applying to appear in front of the Court of Final Appeal) has any reasonable grounds for arguing an appeal. If an appeal is considered arguable, it will appear before an Appeal Committee, who will then make a final decision. If the Registrar determines there is no grounds for an appeal, a "Rule 7 Summons" will be issued, in which the applicant is invited to show on paper why the Appeals Committee should hear their appeal.

The Registrar also helps with listing cases and liaising with the non-permanent judges from both Hong Kong and other common law jurisdictions on sitting in appeal cases.

List of Registrar's

Ref 

Court of Final Appeal (Hong Kong)